St. Gallen Winkeln railway station is a railway station in the Winkeln neighborhood of St. Gallen, in the Swiss canton of St. Gallen. It is an intermediate stop on the St. Gallen–Winterthur line.

Services 
 the following rail services stop at St. Gallen Winkeln:

 St. Gallen S-Bahn:

References

External links 
 
 

Railway stations in the canton of St. Gallen
Swiss Federal Railways stations
Buildings and structures in St. Gallen (city)